Jeanne Morefield (born 1967) is Associate Professor of Political Theory and Fellow at New College, Oxford. She is also a Non-Residential Fellow at the Quincy Institute for Responsible Statecraft, Washington DC.

Books 

 Covenants Without Swords: Idealist Liberalism and the Spirit of Empire (Princeton, 2005)
 Empires Without Imperialism: Anglo American Decline and the Politic of Deflection (Oxford, 2014)
 Unsettling the World: Edward Said and Political Theory (Rowman and Littlefield, 2022)

References

External links
 Unsettling Liberal Hegemony - Interview with Jeanne Morefield

1967 births
Living people